Vår tid är nu (en: Our Time is Now - English translation; The Restaurant - English title) is a Swedish historical drama series with 32 episodes divided into four seasons. The first season premiered at SVT on 2 October 2017, and the second season premiered on 1 October 2018. The third season premiered on 28 October 2019, while the fourth season, bridging gaps that occurred in the storyline between Seasons 1 and 2, was released on 25 December 2020.

Synopsis 
In 1945, the middle-class Löwander family - siblings Gustaf, Peter and Nina and mother Helga - run one of Stockholm's most popular restaurants, Djurgårdskällaren, when the Second World War ends. Eldest son Gustaf has taken the establishment through the war years and wants to run the business as it always looked, while sister Nina falls in love with the kitchen boy Calle with a working-class background and welcomes the new spirit of the times. Middle son Peter returns to the capital from a refugee camp where he has worked during the war years and soon realizes that the family business is in trouble. At the same time, mother Helga, through kitchen manager Stig "Stickan" Backe, still has an eagle eye on the business. In the dining room, the Löwander family houses the faithful servant, butler "Bellan" Roos. The series revolves around Nina and Calle's turbulent relationship, the efforts to maintain and develop the restaurant and the personal struggles of both its management, staff and the multiple generations of the Löwander family, while covering the changes occurring in post-war Sweden until the 1970s.

Cast 
 Hedda Stiernstedt – Nina Löwander
 Charlie Gustafsson – Calle Svensson
 :sv:Mattias Nordkvist – Gustaf Löwander
 Adam Lundgren – Peter Löwander
 Suzanne Reuter – Helga Löwander
 Josefin Neldén – Margareta "Maggan" Nilsson
 Peter Dalle – Stig "Stickan" Backe
 Simone Coppo - Angelo
 Julia Heveus – Christina Rehnskiöld
 Hedda Rehnberg – Suzanne Goldstein
 Hannes Meidal – Philippe Goldstein
 Karin Franz Körlof – Lilly Lindström
 Anna Bjelkerud – Ethel Jonsson
 Göran Ragnerstam – Kurt Ragnarsson
 Rasmus Troedsson – "Bellan" Roos
 Malin Persson – Sonja Persson
 Ida Engvoll – Ester Swärd
 Timo Nieminen – Anders
 Hannes Fohlin – Erik Rehnsköld
 Philip Kuub Olsen – Arvid Löwander
 Björn Granath – August Drugge "Generalen"
 Marika Lindström – Blancheflor Drugge
 Lars Väringer – Kreditindrivare
 Linda Molin – Agnes 
 Michael Petersson – Tage Erlander
 Evin Ahmad – Carmen

References

External links 

2017 Swedish television series debuts
Sveriges Television original programming
Swedish drama television series
Television series set in the 20th century
Television shows set in Stockholm
Swedish-language television shows